Škoda Transportation produces trolleybuses, tramcars, electric locomotives, electric multiple units and rapid transit train systems.

Rail products

Electric locomotives

Electric multiple units

Push–pull trains

Railcars

Tramcars

Metro cars

Trolleybuses

See also 
 :Category:Škoda locomotives
 :Category:Škoda trams

References

External links

 

Škoda Transportation products
Tra